Spong is a surname in multiple Germanic-speaking cultures. In England, it is an archaic term for a narrow strip of land. Notable people with this name include:

 Clive Spong, illustrator of children's books
Dora Beedham, née Spong (1879 – 1969), British nurse from the social activist Spong Family and suffragette who was force-fed.
Spong Family children of James Osborn Spong : Minnie 'Frances' Spong (1863-1953), teacher in Africa; Annie Eliza Spong (1870-1957) suffragette, embroiderer and portrait artist, and natural movement dancer; Irene Osborn Spong (1882-1960), pianist, natural movement dancer and suffragette; Florence Spong (1873-1944), weaver, dressmaker, lacemaker, wood carver; Dora Spong (or Beedham).

 Hilda Spong (1875–1955), English actress
 James Osborn Spong (1839–1925), founder of Spong and Co., kitchen equipment manufacturers
 John Shelby Spong (1931-2021), American Episcopal bishop
 Mark W. Spong (born 1952), American roboticist
 Paul Spong (born 1939), New Zealand biologist
 Richard Spong (born 1983), Swedish footballer
 Roger Spong (1906–1980), English rugby union player
 Sriwhana Spong (born 1979), New Zealand artist
 Tyrone Spong (born 1985), Surinamese-Dutch boxer and kickboxer
 Walter Brookes Spong (1851–1929), British artist
 William B. Spong, Jr. (1920–1997), Virginia Senator

Places
 Spong Hill, Early Saxon cemetery in Norfolk, England

See also
 Spongmonkey, a fictional creature and internet phenomenon, featured in commercials for Quiznos Sub
 Sponge (disambiguation)